The 2014 Ukrainian Cup Final is a football match that was played on 15 May 2014 in Poltava. The match is the 23rd Ukrainian Cup Final and was contested by Cup holders Shakhtar Donetsk and Dynamo Kyiv.

Leadup crisis before the match 
The final was originally to be played at Metalist Stadium, Kharkiv, but was moved to Vorskla Stadium in Poltava.
 Due to the May 2014 pro-Russian conflict in Ukraine, the Football Federation of Ukraine (FFU), after being advised to do so by the Ukrainian Interior Ministry, decided that the match would be played behind closed doors for security reasons.

The decision to have no spectators at the match was met with criticism and protest by both clubs' fans including picketing of the House of Football in Kyiv a day before the match and was reverted after the FFU held an emergency meeting and conferred with club officials and government security.

Road to Poltava

Previous encounters 
This will be the seventh Ukrainian Cup final between the two teams. Dynamo has defeated Shakhtar three times out of the six Cup finals. Dynamo also lost its last two meetings with Shakhtar in this stage of the tournament. Dynamo has not defeated Shakhtar for the past seven years (seven games losing streak) since winning its last cup back in 2006–07.

Dynamo had appeared in 12 cup finals, winning nine trophies, while opponents Shakhtar had appeared in 13 cup finals, also winning nine.

Television 
The match was broadcast on Futbol 2 and Ukrayina in Ukraine.

Match
As the designated home team for the final, Dynamo chose to wear their blue and white kits and Shakhtar chose their familiar orange and black kits.

Details

Match statistics
Tournament official website

See also
 2013–14 Ukrainian Premier League

References

Cup Final
Ukrainian Cup finals
Ukrainian Cup Final 2014
Ukrainian Cup Final 2014
Sport in Poltava
May 2014 sports events in Ukraine